The 1982 United Bank Classic, also known as the Denver WCT, was a men's tennis tournament played on indoor carpet courts in Denver, Colorado in the United States that was part of the 1982 Grand Prix circuit. It was the 11th and last edition of the tournament and took place from February 1 through February 7, 1982. Unseeded John Sadri won the singles competition.

Finals

Singles
 John Sadri defeated  Andrés Gómez 4–6, 6–1, 6–4
 It was Sadri's 1st singles title of the year and the 2nd and final of his career.

Doubles
 Kevin Curren /  Steve Denton defeated  Phil Dent /  Kim Warwick 6–4, 6–4

References

External links
 ITF tournament edition details

United Bank Classic
Indoor tennis tournaments
United Bank Classic
United Bank Classic
United Bank Classic